Monica Seles was the defending champion but lost in the semifinals to Lindsay Davenport.

Davenport won in the final 4–6, 6–4, 6–3 against Martina Hingis.

Seeds
A champion seed is indicated in bold text while text in italics indicates the round in which that seed was eliminated. The top four seeds received a bye to the second round.

  Martina Hingis (final)
  Lindsay Davenport (champion)
  Arantxa Sánchez Vicario (semifinals)
  Monica Seles (semifinals)
  Nathalie Tauziat (quarterfinals)
  Irina Spîrlea (second round)
  Sandrine Testud (second round)
  Natasha Zvereva (quarterfinals)

Draw

Final

Section 1

Section 2

External links
 1998 Acura Classic Draw

LA Women's Tennis Championships
1998 WTA Tour